Georgia State Route 11 Spur may refer to:

 Georgia State Route 11 Spur (Hawkinsville): a former spur route that existed west of Hawkinsville
 Georgia State Route 11 Spur (Perry): a former spur route that existed in Perry

011 Spur